Kurtis Ling, better known as Aui_2000, is a Canadian professional Dota 2 player and coach for Tundra Esports. Kurtis was a member of the Evil Geniuses team that won The International 2015 and coach of the Tundra Esports team that won The International 2022.

Personal life 
Kurtis attended the University of British Columbia before dropping out to play Dota 2 professionally full-time. His parents were initially skeptical of his career choice but eventually accepted it as he won more tournaments.

History 
EG acquired Ling from Cloud9 in January 2015.

On August 14 Aui_2000 was kicked off of the team just days after winning TI5. Artour "Arteezy" Babaev replaced him on the roster. His sudden dismissal after winning the Dota 2 championships sparked some outrage from the community, and forced team captain Peter "ppd" Dager to write a blog detailing the reasons behind Aui_2000's removal from the team.

Shortly after being kicked from EG, Ling formed his own team, Digital Chaos, but struggled to achieve any significant results. On March 25, following the abrupt departure of Artour "Arteezy" Babaev and Saahil "UNiVeRsE" Arora from Evil Geniuses, Ling announced that he would be rejoining the team. Ling was kicked from the team once again after the Manila Major 2016 in June.

For the 2017 season, Aui_2000 joined Team NP. They managed to qualify for The International 2017 before being signed by the Cloud9 organization. They were eliminated during the first round of the Lower Bracket by Team Empire.

For the 2018 season, Aui_2000 joined Forward Gaming as a coach. On July 21, 2019, Forward Gaming was dissolved; the roster was then signed to represent Chinese organization Newbee at The International 2019.

Notes

References

Canadian esports players
Dota players
1992 births
Living people
Sportspeople from Vancouver
Evil Geniuses players
Cloud9 (esports) players
Twitch (service) streamers
University of British Columbia alumni
Articles with underscores in the title
Dota coaches